Airways International was an airline based in Miami, Florida. 
Airways international was founded in 1979 and began operations around 1984. The airline ceased operations in 1999. The carrier's primary business focus was flights within southern Florida and to the Bahamas. Airways International also operated charter flights.

Destinations
In 1985, Airways began service to the Bahamas with Convair 580 aircraft.

Fleet
Throughout its history, Airways operated a fleet of Short 330, Convair 580, Cessna 402, Convair 440, and Piper Aztec aircraft. In 1992, the airline added the Short 330 to its fleet and operated. As of 1992, there were 30 aircraft in its fleet.

See also
 List of defunct airlines of the United States

External links
 Sunshine Skies

Defunct regional airlines of the United States
Airlines based in Florida
Airlines established in 1979
Airlines disestablished in 1999
Defunct companies based in Florida
Defunct airlines of the United States